The marine otter (Lontra felina) is a rare and relatively unknown South American mammal of the weasel family (Mustelidae).  The scientific name means "otter cat", and in Spanish, the marine otter is also often referred to as : "marine cat".  The marine otter (while spending much of its time out of the water) only lives in saltwater, coastal environments and rarely ventures into freshwater or estuarine habitats. This saltwater exclusivity is unlike most other otter species, except for the almost fully aquatic sea otter (Enhydra lutris) of the North Pacific.

Description 

The tail measures . The marine otter is dark brown above and on the sides, and fawn on the throat and underside.

The marine otter has webbed paws and strong claws. The ventral side (underside) of the paws are partially covered in fur.
The teeth are developed for slicing instead of crushing. The marine otter does not display sexual dimorphism.

Distribution and habitat 

Marine otters are found in littoral areas of southwestern South America, close to shore and in the intertidal areas of northern Peru (from the port of Chimbote), along the entire coast of Chile, and the extreme southern reaches of Argentina. Occasional vagrant sightings still occur as far afield as the Falkland Islands.

The marine otter mainly inhabits rocky shorelines with abundant seaweed and kelp, and infrequently visits estuaries and freshwater rivers. It appears to select habitats with surprisingly high exposure to strong swells and winds, unlike many other otters, which prefer calmer waters. Caves and crevices in the rocky shorelines may provide them with the cover they need, and often a holt will have no land access at high tide. Marine otters avoid sandy beaches.

Behavior 

Rocky intertidal zones with natural crevices are ideal for marine otter dens and feeding areas. Because most of their time is spent hidden in caves, their behavior is difficult to observe.

Marine otters actively avoid humans. In response to human activity, they will spend less time on coasts and stray from their dens during the day to fissures inaccessible to humans. Though generally avoidant of humans, their inhabitance of fishing villages is an indicator of the marine otter's ability to adapt to urbanization.

Reproduction 
Marine otters may be monogamous or polygamous, and breeding occurs in December or January. Litters of two to five pups are born in January, February or March after a gestation period of 60 to 70 days. The pups remain with their mother for about 10 months of parental care, and can sometimes be seen on the mother's belly as she swims on her back, a practice similar to that of the sea otter. Parents bring food to the pups and teach them to hunt.

Feeding 
Studies have shown latitudinal variations in diet, feeding periods, and dive time throughout the marine otter's distribution. Marine otters of southern Chile primarily feed on fish, while those in northern Chile mostly feed on crustaceans and mollusks. The otters on Isla La Vieja, Peru presumably prey on a colony of Peruvian diving petrels regularly. In January 2009, one was seen preying on magellanic flightless steamer duck chick in Puñihuil. The species shows opportunistic feeding behavior, sometimes eating small mammals and even fruit of plants like Greigia sphacelata and Fascicularia bicolor.

Taxonomy 
The marine otter is of the Lutrinae, a subfamily of Mustelidae. Its exact taxonomy has been debated due to lack of data. A phylogenetic study by C. G. Van Zyll De Jong in 1987 proposed the following phenogram of the lutrinae, based on morphological data.
Jong's proposed phenogram implied that the marine otter descended from the Asian small-clawed otter, and its closest relative being the North American river otter. A 2004 study contradicted Jong's research. The following was proposed as a part of the taxonomy of the Mustelidae, based on cytochrome b sequences.

Threats 
Human activity on coastlines poses disturbance to marine otters. Humans introduce domestic animals which may also disturb their dens. Humans, as well as domesticated species, may expose a marine otter population to disease. Marine otters may be entangled in fishing nets and die.

Microplastics have been found in the scat of marine otters. The effects of microplastics in marine mammals are still unclear.

Competition and predation
Gulls and South American sea lions may compete with marine otters for prey, the latter known to also attack the otters. Orcas and sharks allegedly prey on the otters, though direct attacks have not been observed.

Parasites
Marine otters are known to be susceptible to Toxoplasma gondii infection along the northern and central coast of Chile, though T. gondii seroprevalence in this otter species is lower than in other aquatic mustelids such as the southern river otter and American mink in southern Chile, likely because of the general dryness of the former environment. Nematodes and acantocephalans are also known endoparasites of this species.

Conservation status 

Marine otters are rare and are protected under Peruvian, Chilean, and Argentine law. In the past, they were extensively hunted both for their fur and due to perceived competition with fisheries. Hunting extirpated them from most of Argentina and the Falkland Islands. Poaching is still a problem, but one of unknown magnitude. It is unknown how many marine otters exist in the wild or what habitats should be preserved to encourage their recovery. Marine otters were listed under CITES Appendix I in 1976, and are listed as endangered by the U.S. Department of the Interior.

References

External links
 
 
 International Otter Survival Fund

marine otter
Marine mammals
Mammals of Argentina
Mammals of Chile
Fauna_of_the_Falkland_Islands
Carnivorans of South America
Marine fauna of South America
Western South American coastal fauna
Endangered animals
Endangered biota of South America
Mammals described in 1782